Ross James Smith (born 11 April 1985) is an Australian badminton player who specialises in the doubles event. He competed for Australia at the 2008 and 2012 Summer Olympics, partnering Glenn Warfe. He also represented Australia at the 2006, 2010, 2014, and 2018 Commonwealth Games.

Achievements

Oceania Championships
Men's doubles

Mixed doubles

BWF International Challenge/Series
Men's doubles

Mixed doubles

  BWF International Challenge tournament
  BWF International Series tournament
  BWF Future Series tournament

References

External links 
 
 
 

1985 births
Living people
People from Swan Hill
Sportsmen from Victoria (Australia)
Australian male badminton players
Badminton players at the 2012 Summer Olympics
Badminton players at the 2008 Summer Olympics
Olympic badminton players of Australia
Badminton players at the 2018 Commonwealth Games
Badminton players at the 2014 Commonwealth Games
Badminton players at the 2010 Commonwealth Games
Badminton players at the 2006 Commonwealth Games
Commonwealth Games competitors for Australia